In mathematics, the Griess algebra is a commutative non-associative algebra on a real vector space of dimension 196884 that has the Monster group M as its automorphism group. It is named after mathematician R. L. Griess, who constructed it in 1980 and subsequently used it in 1982 to construct M. The Monster fixes (vectorwise) a 1-space in this algebra and acts absolutely irreducibly on the 196883-dimensional orthogonal complement of this 1-space.
(The Monster preserves the standard inner product on the 196884-space.)

Griess's construction was later simplified by Jacques Tits and John H. Conway. 

The Griess algebra is the same as the degree 2 piece of the monster vertex algebra, and the Griess product is one of the vertex algebra products.

References

R. L. Griess, Jr, The Friendly Giant, Inventiones Mathematicae  69 (1982), 1-102

Non-associative algebras
Sporadic groups